The 1994 LSU Tigers football team represented Louisiana State University in the 1994 NCAA Division I-A football season.  LSU finished with a 4–7 overall record (3–5 in SEC play). It was Curley Hallman's final season as head coach, as he was fired with two games remaining in the season, although he coached those contests.

The beginning of the end for Hallman came in the season's third game. LSU led an Auburn squad which went 11–0 in 1993 and won its first two games of 1994 under Terry Bowden 23-9 going into the final period, but lost 30-26 when Auburn returned three interceptions for touchdowns in the fourth quarter. Auburn won despite not scoring an offensive touchdown; its other touchdown came on a fumble return.

Hallman's last home game as LSU coach came against his former employer, Southern Mississippi. Hallman was named LSU's coach in November 1990 after leading the Golden Eagles to 26 victories over three seasons, mostly on the strength of future Super Bowl winning quarterback Brett Favre. Southern Miss' 20–18 victory over LSU came in front of the smallest home crowd at Tiger Stadium since 1974. The paid attendance was 51,710, but most LSU officials placed the actual crowd in the neighborhood of 40,000.

Three days after the loss to Southern Miss, LSU announced Hallman's firing. The Tigers closed the season with victories over Tulane and Arkansas, but Hallman still left Baton Rouge with the poorest record (16-28, .364) of any coach in school history.

Schedule

Roster

References

LSU
LSU Tigers football seasons
LSU Tigers football